The General Aircraft Monospar was a 1930s British family of touring and utility aircraft built by General Aircraft Ltd (GAL).

Design and development
In 1929, the Monospar Company Ltd was formed to pursue new techniques of designing cantilever wings, based on the work of Swiss engineer Helmuth J. Stieger, who headed the company. Helmuth John Stieger was born in Zurich in 1902, and educated at the Swiss Federal Polytechnic, and then at the Imperial College of Science in London. While working as a designer for William Beardmore and Company, he formed his own ideas about wing design, and evolved an improved method of building and stressing wings, for which he was later granted a British Patent in December 1927. The principle behind this Patent No. 306,220 was that the wing needed only one spar with torsion loads resisted by an efficient system of strong compression struts, with triangulated bracing in the form of thin wires. The design was revolutionary and very light for its strength.

Based on this design, The Monospar Company designed a twin-engined low-wing aircraft designated the Monospar ST-3, that was built and flown in 1931 by the Gloster Aircraft Company at Brockworth, Gloucestershire. After successful testing of the Monospar ST-3, a new company General Aircraft Ltd was formed to produce aircraft that used the patented Monospar wing designs.

The first production design was the Monospar ST-4, a twin-engined low-wing monoplane with a fixed tailwheel landing gear and folding wings for ground storage. Powered by two Pobjoy R radial engines, the first aircraft (G-ABUZ) first flew in May 1932, and was followed by five production aircraft. The Monospar ST-4 Mk.II, an improved variant with minor differences, followed with a production run of 30. In 1933, the Monospar ST-6 appeared, a similar aircraft to the ST-4, with manually retractable landing gear and room for an extra passenger. The Monospar ST-6 was only the second British aircraft to fly with retractable landing gear (the first, the Airspeed Courier, was flown a few weeks earlier). Another Monospar ST-6 was built, and two ST-4 Mk.IIs were converted. GAL then produced a developed version, the  Monospar ST-10, externally the same but powered by two Pobjoy Niagara engines, an improved fuel system, and aerodynamic refinements. The Monospar ST-11 was developed from the ST-10, with retractable landing gear, and two were built for export to Australia. A production batch of ten Monospar ST-12 aircraft was based on the ST-11, but with de Havilland Gipsy Major engines and fixed landing gear.

The Croydon factory closed down in 1934, and a larger factory was opened in 1935 at London Air Park, Hanworth.

Operational history
The Monospar ST-10 prototype (G-ACTS) won the 1934 King's Cup Air Race with an average speed of 134.16 mph. Only one other ST-10 was built.

Variants

   
Monospar ST-3
Experimental cantilever monoplane, powered by two  British Salmson AD.9 engines; one built.
Monospar ST-4
Cantilever touring monoplane, powered by two  Pobjoy R radial engines, seven built.
Monospar ST-4 Mk.II
Improved variant of Monospar ST-4, 22 built, two later converted to ST-6 standard.
Monospar ST-6
As Monospar ST-4, with manual retractable landing gear, two built plus two conversions from ST-4 Mk.IIs.

Monospar ST-10
Improved variant with two  Pobjoy Niagara engines, two built.
Monospar ST-11
Development of Monospar ST-10, with retractable landing gear, two built.
Monospar ST-12
Fixed landing gear variant with two de Havilland Gipsy Major engines, ten built.
General Aircraft ST-18 Croydon
Ten-seat transport with two Pratt and Whitney Wasp Junior engines, one built.
Monospar ST-25 series
Development of Monospar ST-10

Operators

Portuguese Navy

 South African Air Force

 Spanish Republican Air Force, 1936 from LAPE

 Spanish Air Force

 Turkish Air Force

Civil operators

Australian Transcontinental Airways (ATA), 1935–1936

 VASP, 1933–1938

 Inner Circle Air Lines, 1935-1935

Survivors
 One Monospar ST-12 (registration VH-UTH) is on display at the Newark Air Museum, England

Specifications (Monospar ST-12)

Incidents
On 6 September 1935, a Monospar ST-12 operated by Australian Transcontinental Airways suffered engine failure, and made an emergency landing on Woodgreen Station in the Northern Territory. Reports vary slightly, but the plane was said to be carrying the pilot J. Maher, with two passengers, Renfrey and Maloney, and a young crocodile that was being transported to Adelaide. Three men (one of several search parties sent out to look for the men) motoring across the desert found him, and took him to Aileron telegraph station. In the meantime, Don Thomas from Alice Springs drove to Woodgreen to pick up Purvis Sr and two "blackfellows", one of whom managed to track down the plane based on the description of the location given by Renfrey. Maher and Maloney had only six oranges between them for food, but they survived until they were rescued by shooting and eating the crocodile.

See also

Footnotes

References

Notes

Bibliography

The Illustrated Encyclopedia of Aircraft (Part Work 1982–1985). Orbis Publishing, 1985, p. 2158.
Jackson, A.J. 1973. British Civil Aircraft since 1919, Volume 2. Putnam .
Lewis, Peter. 1971. British Racing and Record-Breaking Aircraft. Putnam  
Ord-Hume, Arthur W. J. G. (2013) The Monospar, from tailless gliders to vast transport: the story of General Aircraft Ltd of Hanworth. Catrine, Ayrshire: Stenlake Publishing.  
Sherwood, Tim. 1999. Coming in to Land: A Short History of Hounslow, Hanworth and Heston Aerodromes 1911–1946. Heritage Publications (Hounslow Library) 
Stroud, John. Wings of Peace, Aeroplane Monthly, April 1988

1930s British civil utility aircraft
Monospar
Low-wing aircraft
Aircraft first flown in 1932
Twin piston-engined tractor aircraft